Downtown Owl is an upcoming American drama film directed by Lily Rabe and Hamish Linklater, in their directorial debuts, from a screenplay by Linklater. It is based on the 2008 novel of the same name by Chuck Klosterman. The film is produced by Rabe, Bettina Barrow, Linklater (in his debut production), Rebecca Green, and Michael Melamedoff under Kill Claudio Productions, Three Point Capital and Esme Grace Media, in association with Stage 6 Films. It stars Rabe, Henry Golding, Jack Dylan Grazer, Vanessa Hudgens, Finn Wittrock, August Blanco Rosenstein and Ed Harris.

Premise
Set in the year of 1983, in the fictional town of Owl, North Dakota, the story centers around three intangibly connected residents—Horace, an old man who spends his afternoons reminiscing better times from the past at the local coffee shop, Mitch, a depressed high school backup quarterback, and Julia, an English teacher at the local high school who recently moved to Owl—whose lives, along with those of the town’s other residents, are upended by a whiteout blizzard.

Cast
 Lily Rabe as Julia
 Ed Harris as Horace
 August Blanco Rosenstein as Mitch
 Henry Golding
 Vanessa Hudgens
 Finn Wittrock

Production
In October 2012, it was announced Adam Scott and Naomi Scott had optioned rights to Downtown Owl by Chuck Klosterman for a planned film adaption to produce under their Gettin Rad Productions banner.

In April 2022, it was announced Lily Rabe, Ed Harris, Vanessa Hudgens, Finn Wittrock, and Jack Dylan Grazer had joined the cast of the film, with Rabe directing and producing alongside Hamish Linklater who wrote the screenplay, and her producing partner Bettina Barrow under their banner, Kill Claudio Productions with Sony Pictures' Stage 6 Films overseeing production and Sony Pictures Releasing set to distribute. The film was a part of the Sundance Institute's Feature Film Program and Creative Producing Initiative under the organization's Creative Producing Summit and Talent Forum. It was also announced that T Bone Burnett had signed on to compose the film score, and Rebecca Green and Michael Melamedoff were co-producing under Three Point Capital and Esme Grace Media. The following day, it was revealed that Henry Golding had joined the cast of the film.

Principal photography began prior to the official announcement, on April 3, 2022 in Minnesota. Filming took place in Saint Paul, Independence, and Elko New Market, and wrapped in early May.

References

External links
 

Upcoming films
American drama films
Films shot in Minnesota
Upcoming directorial debut films
Films set in North Dakota
Stage 6 Films films